Redmi K30 Pro is a line of Android-based smartphones manufactured by Xiaomi and marketed under its Redmi sub-brand. There are four models, the K30 Pro, K30 Pro Zoom, K30 Ultra and the POCO F2 Pro, which is a rebranded version of the K30 Pro.

Design
The K30 Pro line uses an anodized aluminum frame and Gorilla Glass on the front and back. Both the volume and power buttons are located on the right edge; the latter has a red accent. The front-facing camera is concealed by a motorized pop-up mechanism like on the K20 Pro. The camera protrusion on the back panel is a single unit with a dual-LED flash below, and a circular module. Colors available at launch were (Cyber) Grey, (Electric) Purple, (Phantom) White and (Neon) Blue. The K30 Ultra has unique Moonlight White, Midnight Black and Mint Green finishes.

Specifications

Hardware & software
The Pro models are powered by the Snapdragon 865 and Adreno 650, while the K30 Ultra uses the MediaTek Dimensity 1000+ and Mali-G77 MC9. The K30 Pro, K30 Pro Zoom and POCO F2 Pro have either 128 or 256 GB of storage and 6 or 8 GB of RAM with an additional 12 GB RAM/512 GB UFS variant on the K30 Pro Zoom; the 128 GB/6 GB K30 Pro model has UFS 3.0 while other models have UFS 3.1. The POCO F2 Pro has UFS 3.1 on all models and no 8 GB RAM/128 GB UFS variant. At the front, the display is larger than the K20's at 6.67" (169.4mm) and has a wider 20:9 aspect ratio, using an AMOLED panel with an optical fingerprint sensor and HDR10+ support; only the K30 Ultra has a 120 Hz refresh rate. The battery is 4700mAh; fast charging is supported over USB-C up to 30 W or 33 W. The K30 Ultra has a smaller 4500 mAh battery. All devices are pre-installed with MIUI 11, which is based on Android 10

Camera
The wide sensor on all variants has been upgraded from a Sony IMX586 48 MP sensor to a Sony IMX686 64 MP sensor and now features an extra depth sensor. The K30 Pro Zoom benefits from the usage of optical image stabilization on the wide lens. It has an 8 MP telephoto lens with 3x optical zoom, while the K30 Pro and POCO F2 Pro have a 5 MP "telemacro" lens which has twice the focal length of a standard macro lens. Both are accompanied by a 13 MP ultrawide sensor. The front-facing camera uses a motorized pop-up Samsung S5K3T2 20 MP sensor,  f/2.2, (wide), 1/3.4", 0.8µm with HDR.

References

Phablets
Mobile phones introduced in 2020
Mobile phones with multiple rear cameras
Mobile phones with 8K video recording
Mobile phones with infrared transmitter
Discontinued flagship smartphones
K30 Pro